"Groove Mera" was the official anthem of the 2021 Pakistan Super League, the sixth season of the Pakistan Super  League. It was written by Adnan Dhool, and sung by Naseebo Lal, Aima Baig and Young Stunners.

Background 
On 16 January 2021, It was reported that Aima Baig, Naseebo Lal, and Young Stunners will be singing the official anthem for the sixth edition of PSL. The lyrics for the EDM-anthem have been written by Adnan Dhool reflecting the realities of COVID-19 pandemic for TV audience and feel of cricketers; and it is composed by Xulfi. It was released on 6 February 2021, with the music video directed by Fida Moin,  and starring Pakistan national cricket team players Shadab Khan, Babar Azam, Shaheen Shah Afridi, Shan Masood, Wahab Riaz and Sarfaraz Ahmed representing their respective franchises in ascending order.

Reception
The song released to mixed reception, one vocal critic was former Pakistan bowler Shoaib Akhtar. Akhtar speaking on his YouTube channel said that the song was "the worst song that he had heard in the history of the PSL" and that it scared his kids. He even offered to sing next edition's anthem.

The anthem received mixed reactions from audiences and, as of January 2022, has reached 17 million+ views on YouTube since its release, making it second most-viewed PSL anthem after "Abh Khel Jamay Ga" which has 17 million views. The anthem has over 350K likes and 200K dislikes on YouTube, making it the most-liked and the most-disliked anthem out all of PSL anthems.

See also 

 List of Pakistan Super League anthems

References 

2021
2021
2021 songs